Rudolf Raimann (1863 – 5 December 1896 in Vienna) was an Austrian botanist.

In 1889 he received his doctorate from the University of Vienna, where his influences included botanist Julius Wiesner. He worked as a volunteer in the department of botany at the Imperial Natural History Museum, and for a period of time taught classes in natural history at the Handelsakademie (school of business and commerce) in Vienna. The plant genus Raimannia (J.N. Rose ex N.L. Britton & A. Brown, 1913) of the family Onagraceae commemorates his name.

Published works 
He made contributions in regards to the section on Onagraceae in Engler and Prantl's Die Natürlichen Pflanzenfamilien. A few of his other writings include:
 Mittheilungen über Fichtenformen aus der Umgebung von Lunz (1888).
 Über unverholzte Elemente in der innersten Xylemzone der Dicotyledonen (1889).
 Ueber einige Krankheitserscheinungen der Nadelhölzer (1890).

References 

1863 births
1896 deaths
University of Vienna alumni
Scientists from Vienna
19th-century Austrian botanists